Eburostola amazonica is a species of beetle in the family Cerambycidae, the only species in the genus Eburostola.

References

Eburiini